Kyle Patrick Reynish (born November 3, 1983) is a former American soccer goalkeeper.

Playing career

Youth and college 

Reynish attended Hart High School in Santa Clarita, California where he had a 0.84 career goals against average, as well as setting the school's single-season (14) and career (38) shutout records. He played college soccer for the University of California Santa Barbara from 2002–2006, sitting out between his freshman and sophomore seasons as a redshirt in the 2003 season. He was the starting goalkeeper and played every minute for UCSB in their 2006 season, in which the school won its first NCAA Division 1 National Championship. Reynish was 1st Team All Big West his senior year.

Club 
During his college years Reynish also played with Bakersfield Brigade in the USL Premier Development League.

Reynish was selected in the fourth round, 43rd overall, of the 2007 MLS Supplemental Draft by Real Salt Lake on January 18, 2007. Reynish played for RSL in friendlies against the Fiji national football team, the China national football team, and English side Everton, as well as in the MLS Reserve Division, but did not make his senior debut until May 2, 2009, when he came on as a substitute for an injured Nick Rimando in a game against Colorado Rapids, two years and four months after being signed.

During 2010 Reynish was loaned to USL Second Division side Charleston Battery, and played three games for them during their USL2 Championship-winning season.  Reynish was released by Salt Lake on December 3, 2012.  He entered the 2012 MLS Re-Entry Draft and became a free agent after going undrafted in both rounds of the draft. Reynish signed with North American Soccer League side New York Cosmos for the fall season. He helped the club capture the 2013 Fall Championship and Soccer Bowl 2013 titles.  He was named the best goalkeeper for the 2013 season, winning the NASL Golden Glove award.

Reynish re-joined Major League Soccer in January 2014 when he signed with Chicago Fire. He made one regular season start for Chicago during the 2014 season.

On January 20, 2015, Reynish was traded to New York Red Bulls for a 2016 MLS SuperDraft pick. Reynish was loaned to affiliate side New York Red Bulls II and made his debut as a starter for the side on April 4, 2015 helping the club to its first  victory, a 4–1 result over Toronto FC II.

Reynish was traded by New York to expansion side Atlanta United FC in exchange for a fourth-round pick in the 2018 MLS SuperDraft on March 1, 2017.

Reynish signed with USL side Fresno FC on March 12, 2018 for the 2018 season.

Reynish announced his retirement from playing professional soccer at the end of the 2018 USL season.

Honors

Club 
UC Santa Barbara
 NCAA Division I Men's Soccer Championship (1): 2006

New York Cosmos
 North American Soccer League (1): 2013 Fall Championship
 NASL Soccer Bowl (1): 2013

New York Red Bulls
MLS Supporters' Shield (1): 2015

Individual 
 NASL Golden Glove Award (1): 2013

References

External links 
 Chicago Fire player profile
 
 
 
 
 UC Santa Barbara player profile

1983 births
Living people
Sportspeople from Santa Clarita, California
American soccer players
UC Santa Barbara Gauchos men's soccer players
Bakersfield Brigade players
Real Salt Lake players
Charleston Battery players
New York Cosmos (2010) players
Chicago Fire FC players
New York Red Bulls players
New York Red Bulls II players
Atlanta United FC players
Fresno FC players
Association football goalkeepers
USL League Two players
USL Second Division players
Major League Soccer players
North American Soccer League players
USL Championship players
Real Salt Lake draft picks
People from Valencia, Santa Clarita, California